Eyvanki Rural District is a rural district (dehestan) in Eyvanki District, Garmsar County, Semnan Province, Iran. At the 2006 census, its population was 2,791, in 795 families.  The rural district has 23 villages.

References 

Rural Districts of Semnan Province
Garmsar County